The 1985 Intercontinental Cup was an Association football match played on 8 December 1985, between Juventus, winners of the 1984–85 European Cup, and Argentinos Juniors, winners of the 1985 Copa Libertadores. Recognised as the best edition in the history of the tournament for technical and agonistic level, the match was played at the National Stadium in Tokyo. It was Juventus' second appearance into the competition, after replacing Ajax in 1973.

Venue

Match

Summary

The final is regarded as the best Intercontinental Cup ever played, due to the technical virtues of both teams. Despite Juventus arriving in Tokyo as the favorites to win the match, Argentinos Juniors' performance surprised everyone due to its style of play, efficacy and the outstanding performance of 20-year old forward Claudio Borghi, the most notable player of his team. Thirty years after the final, Borghi himself admitted that Argentinos Juniors lost the final because its players relayed excessively in their conditions.

After their triumph in the competition, Juventus became the first football team ever—remained the only one until 2022—to have won all official continental competitions and the world title.

Also, Italian defenders Gaetano Scirea and Antonio Cabrini became the first European footballers to have won all international club competitions and Giovanni Trapattoni, the first European manager in association football history to do so.

French midfielder Michel Platini was awarded as man of the match.

Details

|valign="top" width="50%"|

|}

See also
1984–85 European Cup
1985 Copa Libertadores
Juventus F.C. in European football

References

Intercontinental Cup
Intercontinental Cup
Intercontinental Cup
Intercontinental Cup (football)
Intercontinental Cup 1985
Intercontinental Cup 1985
Intercontinental Cup 1985
Intercontinental Cup (football) matches hosted by Japan
i
i
Sports competitions in Tokyo
December 1985 sports events in Asia
1985 in Tokyo
1985 in association football